María Virginia Guevara Sánchez (born 4 October 2000) is a Panamanian footballer who plays as a midfielder for Israeli club Hapoel Marmorek Rehovot and the Panama women's national team.

Career
Guevara has appeared for the Panama women's national team, including in the 2020 CONCACAF Women's Olympic Qualifying Championship qualification against Guatemala. She also appeared at the 2020 CONCACAF Women's Olympic Qualifying Championship against Costa Rica.

See also
 List of Panama women's international footballers

References

External links
 

2000 births
Living people
Panamanian women's footballers
Women's association football midfielders
Ligat Nashim players
Panama women's international footballers
Pan American Games competitors for Panama
Footballers at the 2019 Pan American Games
Panamanian expatriate women's footballers
Panamanian expatriate sportspeople in Israel
Expatriate women's footballers in Israel